John Barrett is the eponymous brand of beauty and hair salons by hairstylist John Barrett.  The salon opened in the penthouse of Bergdorf Goodman Building in 1996.

History 
The fifth in a family of ten, Barrett grew up in Limerick, Ireland. He moved to London as a teenager in the mid-1970s, and became a hairdressing apprentice. In the late 1980s, Barrett moved to Los Angeles for several years, where he began to meet and befriend actresses and fashion editors.

After another stint back in London, Barrett moved to New York in the early 1990s. In 1996, Barrett was chosen to open his own salon at the Bergdorf Goodman Building. This penthouse space—formerly the famous Goodman apartment—offers views of Central Park. The interior of the salon was designed by David Collins.

John Barrett Salon 
In 2011, Barrett launched a service called the Braid Bar in the salon, later renamed as Barrett's Braids. It is for clients that want to have their hair braided. John Barrett was the first salon to introduce the concept of a braid bar in 2011 and received a lot of media coverage for it. Three editors from the People magazine went to the braid bar in 2013 and reviewed that, "The three of us got so many compliments that it made the cost seem totally worth it." "If you’re stuck in a hair rut, a braid bar is the place for you. John Barrett Salon will have you ready for a girls’ night out in no time!" wrote the Latina magazine.

A ponytail bar has also opened in the salon. The ponytail bar has also been reviewed by multiple media outlets.

John Barrett Brand 
John Barrett also manufacturers and markets a collection of hair care products.

John Barrett is also the author of "Hair," published in 2016 by Assouline.

In the media 
Isabella Behrens, fashion market editor at Vanity Fair visited the salon and wrote "the sophisticated staff makes you feel so incredibly at ease. You will never want to go anywhere else. Can you already tell I am a John Barrett junkie?” Vogue wrote about the salon that "Barrett’s stylists can do everything from the artfully undone (bringing to mind the fall Lanvin and Rag & Bone shows) to the intricate and impeccable."

In 2014, the Neroli Portofino pedicure at John Barrett was featured in Vogue's Guide to the Country's Best Pedicure Salons. It was also featured by W Magazine in Best Pedicure Destinations in New York City in 2014.

References 

Privately held companies based in New York City
Retail companies established in 1996
Hair salons